The London, Brighton and South Coast Railway (LB&SCR) C1 class was a type of 0-6-0 freight steam locomotive designed by William Stroudley.

Construction and use
The twelve locomotives in the class were built by Brighton Works between 1882 and 1887, based upon Stroudley's disappointing C class 0-6-0 design of 1873–74, but incorporating a larger boiler. However, the new locomotives were not as successful as Stroudley's designs for passenger locomotives and no further examples were built. Their comparatively short lives were spent hauling freight trains on the LB&SCR. Most of the members of the class were withdrawn between 1907 and 1911, but two examples survived until 1920 and 1924 respectively. One locomotive (number 428) was sold to the Stratford-upon-Avon and Midland Junction Railway, and survived until June 1925.

Accidents
On 11 March 1905, No. 425 ran into a turntable well.

Locomotive Summary

References

 
 

C1
0-6-0 locomotives
Railway locomotives introduced in 1882
Scrapped locomotives
Standard gauge steam locomotives of Great Britain
Freight locomotives